Hendrik Pekeler (born 2 July 1991) is a German handball player for THW Kiel and the German national team.

He participated at the 2019 World Men's Handball Championship.

After the 2020 Summer Olympics he announced he will be taking a long break from the national team.

Achievements
Summer Olympics:
: 2016
European Championship:
: 2016
EHF Champions League:
: 2010, 2020
  EHF Cup:
: 2019
National Championship of Germany:
: 2010, 2016, 2017, 2020, 2021
DHB-Pokal:
: 2019, 2022
DHB-Supercup:
: 2016, 2017, 2020, 2021, 2022

Individual awards 

 Handball Player of the Year in Germany: 2020
 All-Star Team as Best Defender in EHF Champions League: 2022

References

External links

1991 births
Living people
German male handball players
People from Itzehoe
THW Kiel players
Rhein-Neckar Löwen players
Bergischer HC players
Handball-Bundesliga players
Olympic handball players of Germany
Handball players at the 2016 Summer Olympics
Medalists at the 2016 Summer Olympics
Olympic bronze medalists for Germany
Olympic medalists in handball
Handball players at the 2020 Summer Olympics
Sportspeople from Schleswig-Holstein